The 2014 Supertaça de Angola (27th edition) was contested by Kabuscorp, the 2013 Girabola champion and Petro de Luanda, the 2013 Angola cup winner.

It was the first match to be played in a single leg format, since the competition began in 1985.

Before a 50,000 capacity crowd at Estádio 11 de Novembro, Kabuscorp beat Petro 3–1 to secure their 1st title.

Match details

See also
 2013 Angola Cup
 2013 Girabola
 Kabuscorp players
 Petro de Luanda players

External links
 Match photos

References

Supertaça de Angola
Super Cup